Alioune Bâ (born 1959) is a Malian photographer.

Bâ was born in Bamako. He started working for the Musée National du Mali (National Museum of Mali) in 1983. His art focuses on the body, in particular the hands and feet of his subjects.

Publications

Publications by Bâ
Alioune Ba Photographe. Les Carnets de la Création. Montreuil, France: De l Oeil, 1985. . With an essay by Claudie Rieu, "Le bruissement du monde".

Publications with contributions by Bâ
Photographes de Bamako: de 1935 à nos jours. Collection Soleil. Paris: Revue Noire, 1989. . Photographs by Bâ, Mountaga Dembélé, Seydou Keïta, Félix Diallo, Sakaly, AMAP, Emmanuel Daou, Abdourahmane Sakaly, Malick Sidibé, and others. With a text by Érika Nimis. In French and English.

References

External links
Biography of Alioune Bâ

1959 births
Living people
Malian photographers
People from Bamako
20th-century photographers
21st-century photographers
21st-century Malian people